I Hate My Job is an American reality television series about young men abandoning their careers for the chance to pursue unfulfilled dreams. The show was hosted by Al Sharpton. It was shown on Spike TV from 2004 to 2005.

External links
 

2004 American television series debuts
2005 American television series endings